Reuzegom (established 1946) was a Flemish fraternity at KU Leuven, part of the Antwerp Guild of student societies. It is known for a 2013 case of animal abuse and a 2018 case of psychological and physical abuse of three recruits that resulted in the death of one and the dissolution of the fraternity.

History 
The fraternity was founded on 21 February 1946, by Frans De Meester, Remi Verselder and Hugo Schiltz. The original name of the society was OXACO-Leuven, an abbreviation for "Leuven chapter of Xaverius College Alumni". It grouped students at the Catholic University of Leuven who were alumni of Xaverius College, a secondary school in Borgerhout, Antwerp.

At the time of its dissolution in 2018, the club had approximately thirty active members. All members were students of law, engineering, and business engineering at the KU Leuven. The fraternity was considered elitist, and protected its exclusivity through a tradition of extreme hazing. The fraternity had no black members until 2015. The second person of color to apply died during his initiation in 2018 as a result of abuse by seventeen other Reuzegom members.

The Reuzegom emblem consisted of the Flemish Lion and the green and white house colors.

Cruelty complaint 
In 2013, animal rights group GAIA lodged a complaint against the club, after a video was leaked in which the fraternity had filmed themselves abusing and killing a piglet as part of the Reuzegom hazing ceremony. No one was charged.

Hazing charter 
Later in 2013, after the animal cruelty incident, KU Leuven drew up a "hazing charter" to be signed by student societies, fraternities and sororities, in an attempt to make hazing practices safer. Signing the charter would have been a pledge to notify the city of the place and time of the hazing ceremony, and to abstain from violence, racism, extortion, bullying, sexual assault, discrimination, and the use of vertebrates. Reuzegom, as well as the other fraternities and sororities of the Antwerp Guild, refused. In April 2019,  the 28 other fraternities in Leuven signed the charter.

Death of Sanda Dia 
In 2018, the twenty-year-old student Sanda Dia died as a result of the physical abuse he underwent during the two-day-long Reuzegom hazing ritual in Leuven and at a cabin in the woods in Vorselaar. He was admitted to Malle Hospital on 5 December at 9.15 p.m. At arrival, his body temperature was recorded as 27.2 °C (81 °F). He was presented bleeding from nose and mouth, and he was found to have extreme levels of blood salinity resulting from forced consumption of fish sauce and his peers' refusal to let him drink water or soda. A few hours after his arrival in the hospital, Dia died from multiple organ failure. Two other students, who also went through the hazing process were admitted to hospital suffering from hypothermia. and the two are civil participants in the on-going criminal case against students of the Reuzegom fraternity who were involved in the hazing.

While Dia was being treated in the hospital, the Reuzegom members, within a few hours, attempted to cover up what had happened by clearing the hut and the surrounding domain in Vorselaar of evidence of the abuse. When a police commissioner arrived at the scene at 4 a.m., he noted that it was "completely clean": not a garbage bag had been left behind. The pit in the ground in which Dia was later proven to have lain in icy water for hours had been filled in. The members of the club had also attempted to erase their digital traces, but some videos and photos were recovered. They showed Dia unconscious on the ground, a Reuzegom member defecating on someone (Dia or another initiate) in the pit, and the group chanting "Chop off those little hands, the Congo is ours" (a slur celebrating the colonial atrocities committed in the Congo Free State which included mass mutilation of Africans) to a homeless person of color on the street.

Police recovered deleted WhatsApp messages revealing that Reuzegom members, whose parents were "judges, business leaders and politicians", had scrambled to "cover their tracks" in the wake of the death. No member of the club, past or present, has issued a statement of apology to the family of the victim, either collectively or individually.

Dissolution 
Following Dia's death, Reuzegom was dissolved. As of July 2020, the identity of all Reuzegom members present and past had been, and remained, successfully removed from the internet and media, even though the names of the members, alumni and presidium (the governing members) were public knowledge, and even though Reuzegom alumni were known (already before Dia's death) to hold positions of power and responsibility.

Although initially it was said the students present at the 2018 hazing ceremony would be suspended from the university, this did not happen. Instead, the suspension was replaced with a disciplinary sanction of thirty hours of community service: the possibilities included writing an essay on the history of hazing traditions, providing free tutoring, and attending a holiday program.

Judicial investigation and trial 
The criminal investigation of Sanda Dia's death concluded in July 2020, with a recommendation that Reuzegom members be charged with negligent homicide, humiliation, and premeditated administration of dangerous substances. Because one Reuzegom member involved in Dia's death is the son of a judge in Antwerp, the case could not be filed in Antwerp: to avoid conflicts of interest, the case has been moved to the neighboring province of Limburg. The start of the trial itself, planned for early September, was delayed by a petition for further investigations by five of the accused. Trial lawyer Sven Mary, acting for Sanda Dia's father, stated that it would be better to allow this than to give grounds for a later appeal, but was critical of the last-minute timing.

Public opinion 
After the conclusion of the judicial investigation in July 2020, a reconstruction of the 2018 Reuzegom initiation rite was published, leading to public outcry. The hashtag #JusticeForSanda circulated on social media, encapsulating the concern that if the eighteen Reuzegom members implicated in the events of 2018 were not charged with felonies, they could continue their studies and, like their predecessors, come to occupy positions of power in society and in the legal system.

On 4 September 2020, the day the trial was to have opened, a student protest calling for "Justice for Sanda" was held in Leuven, followed the next day by a silent vigil to commemorate Dia.

See also 
 Fraternities and sororities
 Hazing
 Conformity
 List of hazing deaths in the United States
 Death of Tim Piazza#Criminal prosecutions
 Matt's Law

References

Student organizations
1946 establishments in Belgium
2018 disestablishments in Belgium